, also known as The Inferno of First Love and Nanami, First Love, is a 1968 Japanese drama film directed by Susumu Hani. It was co-scripted by Hani and Shūji Terayama.  The film competed for the Golden Bear award at the 18th Berlin International Film Festival in 1968.

Plot
Nanami, a young nude dancer, and her friend Shun, who is still a virgin, rent a room in a love hotel. He isn't able to make love to her, but she is understanding about it. They both reflect on their past; Nanami came from Shizuoka to Tokyo and started working as a dancer because her former job didn't pay enough, Shun was left by his mother as a child and now works as a goldsmith in his stepfather's workshop. In flashbacks, it is revealed that Shun was and is still being repeatedly sexually abused by his stepfather. A customer of Nanami, Ankokuji, talks her into participating in erotic photo shootings with other models, which are also attended by members of the red light district and the yakuza. Shun, who witnessed the photo shootings and is jealous of Ankokuji, confronts him and Nanami. Ankokuji explains his interest in Nanami with his loveless marriage, but when Nanami later sees him with his seemingly harmonic family, she turns away from him in disappointment. Nanami and Shun continue seeing each other and make another appointment in the love hotel. On his way to the hotel, Shun is stopped by Ankokuji's former red light district associates, who try to press him into telling them Nanami's whereabouts. Shun flees and is fatally hit by a car when he crosses the street. Nanami, who waits for Shun in the hotel apartment, hears the voices from the street, opens the window and sees Shun's body surrounded by passers-by.

Cast
 Kuniko Ishii – Chiaki Nanami
 Akio Takahashi – Shun
 Haruo Asanu – Algebra
 Ichirō Kimura – Psychiatrist
 Kazuo Kimura – Doctor
 Kōji Mitsui – Mr. Otagaki, Shun's stepfather (although the role is credited to the popular actor Kōji Mitsui (三井弘次) in many English-language reference works, the character is portrayed by a different actor whose name's Kanji characters (満井幸治) also translate to "Kōji Mitsui," and whose only film credit is this role.)
 Kazuko Fukuda – Mrs. Otagaki, Shun's stepmother
 Misako Miyato – Mother
 Minoru Yuasa – Ankokuji
 Kimiko Nakamura – Ankokuji's wife

Release
Nanami: The Inferno of First Love grossed over $1 million in Japan. The film was originally released in the United States with 20 minutes cut.

Reception
Many film scholars consider this work to be one of Hani's major achievements, while others judge the film to be commercial and exploitive. In A Hundred Years of Japanese Film, film historian Donald Richie called it "one of the seminal films of the sixties".

In 2012, filmmaker Ashim Ahluwalia included the film in his personal top ten (for The Sight & Sound Top 50 Greatest Films of All Time poll), writing: "Nanami: Inferno of First Love delivers emerging adolescent sexuality and lyrical debauchery as only the Japanese New Wave can. Do not accept imitations!"

References

Bibliography

External links
 
 
 
 

1968 films
1968 drama films
Japanese erotic drama films
Films directed by Susumu Hani
1960s Japanese-language films
1960s erotic drama films
1960s Japanese films